Tetrode can refer to:

 Tetrode, an electronic device with four active electrodes, such as a vacuum tube
 Beam tetrode
 Field-effect tetrode, a solid-state device
 Tetrode (biology), an electrode used in biology to sample neural signals
 Tetrode transistor, a transistor with four active terminals
 Sackur–Tetrode equation, an expression for the entropy of a monatomic classical ideal gas
 Hugo Tetrode, a Dutch physicist (1895–1931)
 Willem Danielsz van Tetrode, a Dutch sculptor (ca. 1530 – ca. 1587)